Waukesha High School is the name of numerous high schools in Waukesha, Wisconsin:

 Waukesha East Alternative School, part of the Waukesha School District
 Waukesha North High School (est. 1974)
 Waukesha South High School (est. 1957)
 Waukesha West High School (est. 1993)